Kibroth Hattaavah or Kibroth-hattaavah (graves of craving) is one of the locations which the Israelites passed through during their Exodus journey, recorded in the Book of Numbers. It was at this place, according to the biblical narrative, that the Israelites loudly complained about constantly eating only manna, and that they had enjoyed a much more varied diet, of fish, vegetables, fruit and meat, when they lived in Egypt; the text states that this led Moses, in despair, to cry out to Yahweh, who then promised them so much meat that 'they would vomit it through their nostrils'. The narrative goes on to tell of a huge number of quails brought by the winds to both sides of the Israelite encampment, which the people gathered. Modern translations imply that Yahweh sent the plague as they were chewing the first meat that fell

The biblical narrative argues that name of Kibroth-hattaavah, which appears to mean graves of lust, derives from these events, since the plague killed the people who lusted after meat, who were then buried there. According to biblical scholars, this is merely an aetiological myth to theologically justify a pre-existing place name; a number of biblical scholars have proposed that the graves (kibroth) in the name kibroth-hattaavah actually refers to a stone circle or cairns, or to recently discovered Chalcolithic (~fourth Millennium BC) megalithic burial sites known as nawamis, meaning mosquitos, which are unique to the central Sinai Peninsula and southern Negev.

According to textual scholars, the account concerning Kibroth-hattaavah is part of the Jahwist text, and occurs at the same point in the Exodus narrative as the account of Taberah in the Elohist text; indeed, one or both of Tabarah (תבערה) and Hattavah (התאוה) may be phonological and typographical corruptions of the same original word. Taberah is not listed in the full stations list later in the Book of Numbers, with the people going straight from Mount Sinai to Kibroth-hattavah, and there is no hint that the Israelites had to travel from Taberah to Kibroth-hattaavah, implying that they were the same location; nevertheless, Taberah and Kibroth-hattaavah are listed as different places by a passage in Deuteronomy, which textual scholars ascribe to the deuteronomist, and consequently date to over two centuries later than the Jahwist and Elohist, and also later than the combined JE text.

Taberah is described by the Torah as being three days journey from Mount Sinai, and therefore its modern identification relies heavily on the identification of Mount Sinai. The traditional identification of Mount Sinai as one of the mountains at the southern tip of the Sinai Peninsula would imply that Taberah and Kibroth-hattaavah was/were probably in the Wadi Murrah, about 30 miles north-east of the southern tip, and exactly a day's journey from 'Ain Hudherah; in this area, at the Erweis el-Ebeirig, an ancient encampment has been found, but it dates to the Early Bronze Age (the early third millennium BC). The traditional location of Mount Sinai has been rejected some scholars , as well as theologians, who favour a location at Mount Seir or in north western Saudi Arabia, and others views propose locations in the Negev, or the central or northern Sinai desert.

In culture
 In the 1858 boys' novel Eric, or, Little by Little certain unnamed "vile" activities (presumably masturbation) are referred back to Kibroth-Hattaavah - "Don't you remember Rowlands' sermon not two weeks ago on Kibroth-Hattaavah?"

References

Bibliography
 Grant R. Jeffrey, The Signature of God, Pages 60–68, 132–135

Book of Numbers